Carlton Bloc was a residential bloc located in Bucharest, Romania, at 9 Nicolae Bălcescu Boulevard, completed in October 1936.

The building, comprising 96 apartments, was located between University Square and Piața Romană, at the intersection of the Nicolae Bălcescu Boulevard with Royal Street (nowadays, Ion Câmpineanu Street). On the ground level, the bloc had several stores and a large cinema, also called the Carlton.

The Carlton Bloc was designed by architects George Matei Cantacuzino and Vasile Arion. The master plan for the systematization of Bucharest, elaborated by the City Hall in 1935, was the basis for the construction, as were most other tall buildings erected in the center of the capital at the time. The construction was carried out by the enterprise of the brothers Karl and Leopold Schindl. The calculations for the reinforced concrete structure that conferred the strength of the building were performed by the engineer Franz Schüssler.

The Carlton Bloc collapsed during the November 10, 1940 Vrancea earthquake. The earthquake, with a magnitude of 7.4 on the Richter scale, happened at 3:39 am (local time), when most residents were at home. According to Constantin Bălăceanu-Stolnici, the collapse of the building killed at least 150–160 people, although other accounts put the death toll at 200–220, with a single survivor (a watchman on the top floor).

References

Demolished buildings and structures in Bucharest
History of Bucharest
Collapsed buildings and structures
Residential buildings completed in 1936
Buildings and structures demolished in 1940